Welcome to the Sonic Space Age is a Man or Astro-man? 7" EP released on Clawfist Records in 1995 and pressed exclusively on black vinyl.

Track listing

Side Y
"King of the Monsters"

Side Z
"Bird's Stuff" (The Motivations)

Line Up
Star Crunch: Gutarimation
Captain Zeno: Subordinate Guitarimation on "King", Bassotron on "Bird's Stuff"
Birdstuff: Drumomatics
CoCo: Bassotron on "King", Thereminiting on "Bird's Stuff"

References

Man or Astro-man? EPs
1995 EPs